Sharaf al-Din Fazlullah Qazvini (died 1339) was the author of the Persian language Mu‘jam fi athar muluk al-Ajam, a history of ancient Iran.

References

Sources 
  

Ilkhanate-period poets
Historians of the Hazaraspids

1339 deaths

Year of birth unknown